Chukwuemeka Ohanaemere, predominantly known as Odumeje, is a Nigerian clergyman and general overseer of The Mountain of Holy Ghost Intervention and Deliverance Ministry and a musician.

Early life
Odumeje was born in Imo State, Nigeria into a family of six children and was the third born child. He had very limited formal education as he dropped out of school at an early age and cited "financial constraints" as the root cause. Prior to becoming a clergyman, he relocated to Anambra State in search of a better life, where he established a business as a struggling leather designer, a profession he would eventually abandon to establish a church.

Religious activity
Odumeje's claimed methods of healing earned him the title; "The wrestling pastor"  Odumeje had a feud with a former female associate, known as Ada Jesus, who accused him of being a false prophet and a charlatan who stage managed miracles. Upon being described as a “money-inclined show maker” he declared his detractors to be noisemakers.

In March 2022, his church building was identified as one of the houses obstructing drainage channels in Okpoko, Onitsha and a part of the church was marked for demolition. The Governor of Anambra State, Prof. Charles Chukwuma Soludo had pledged to clear the drainage channels to check flooding in the area. He was manhandled by the government officials that came for the demolition exercise as he tried to stop them from carrying out the operation. However, Governor Soludo reacted to the incident by promising to discipline those that manhandled Odumeje and also warned that the pastor should be ready to bear the cost of demolition since he was given adequate notice before the exercise was carried out.

Personal life

Odumeje is married to Uju Ohanaemere.

References

Igbo people
Living people
Nigerian clergy
1982 births
People from Imo State